Fiji Television Limited is one of Fiji's main television network. It was founded on 15 June 1994 as the first permanent commercial television broadcasting network in the country, although television had previously been introduced temporarily in October 1991 to broadcast the Rugby World Cup as well as Cricket World Cup. This was reviewed and reissued in 2000 for a term of 12 years. Fiji TV was listed as a public company in 1996 on the Suva Stock Exchange, now known as the South Pacific Stock Exchange.

Fiji TV owns Fiji's premier free-to-view channel (FTA) Fiji One, and formerly the pay TV service, Sky Pacific, which was acquired by Digicel in 2016. Fiji TV also owned subsidiary company Media Niugini Limited, which operates Papua New Guinea's only commercial free-to-view channel, EM TV, but later sold it off to the PNG Government-owned Telikom PNG Limited.in the year 2016

Fiji TV's main shareholders are Fijian Holding Limited (FHL) Media Limited, Hari Punja and Sons Limited, FHL Trustees Limited and FHL Holdings Unit Trust, ITaukei Affairs Board, Capital Insurance Limited, and Fiji National Provident Fund.

Following the passage of the Media Industry Development Decree 2010 by the military regime, Hari Punja resigned from the board of Fiji Television.

References

External links 
 Fiji TV Online
 EMTV Online
 SKY Pacific

Television stations in Fiji
Television channels and stations established in 1994
1994 establishments in Fiji